Taracidae is a family of harvestmen in the order Opiliones. There are 4 genera and 23 described species in Taracidae.

Species

There are currently 23 described species of Taracidae, listed below. The genera Crosbycus and Hesperonemastoma are not considered to belong to the family by some, though a new family has not yet been erected for those genera, so they are included here.

 Crosbycus Roewer, 1914
Crosbycus dasycnemus (Crosby, 1911)
 Hesperonemastoma Gruber, 1970
Hesperonemastoma kepharti (Crosby & Bishop, 1924)
 Hesperonemastoma modestum (Banks, 1894)
 Hesperonemastoma packardi (Roewer, 1914)
 Hesperonemastoma pallidimaculosum (Goodnight & Goodnight, 1945)
 Hesperonemastoma smilax Shear, 2010
 Oskoron Shear, 2016
Oskoron brevichelis Shear, 2016
 Oskoron crawfordi Shear, 2016
 Oskoron spinosus (Banks, 1894)
 Taracus Simon, 1879 
 Taracus aspenae Shear, 2018
 Taracus audisioae Shear, 2016
 Taracus birsteini Ljovuschkin, 1971
 Taracus carmanah Shear, 2016
 Taracus fluvipileus Shear, 2016
 Taracus gertschi Goodnight & Goodnight, 1942
 Taracus malkini Goodnight &  Goodnight, 1945 (California)
 Taracus marchingtoni Shear, 2016
 Taracus nigripes Goodnight &  Goodnight, 1943 (Colorado)
 Taracus packardi Simon, 1879
 Taracus pallipes Banks, 1894
 Taracus silvestrii Roewer, 1929
 Taracus spesavius Shear, 2016
 Taracus spinosus Banks, 1894 (California)
 Taracus taylori Shear, 2016
 Taracus timpanogos Shear, 2016
 Taracus ubicki Shear, 2016

References

Further reading

 
 

Harvestmen
Harvestman families